Classeya symetrica is a moth in the family Crambidae. It was described by Graziano Bassi in 1999. It is found in the Democratic Republic of the Congo.

References

Crambinae
Moths described in 1999